Turkish Aerospace Inc. (TAI; , TUSAŞ)  is the center of technology in design, development, manufacturing, integration of aerospace systems, modernization and after sales support in Turkey.

Located in Ankara, the Turkish Aerospace production plant covers an area of 5 million square meters with an industrial facility of 150,000 square meters under its roof. The company has a modern aircraft facility furnished with high technology machinery and equipment that provide extensive manufacturing capabilities ranging from parts manufacturing to aircraft assembly, flight tests and delivery.

As of 2010, Turkish Aerospace employs over 1500 engineers, of whom approximately 850 are research and development engineers working in military research projects.

Projects

TAI's experience includes the licensed production of General Dynamics F-16 Fighting Falcon jets, CASA/IPTN CN-235 light transport/maritime patrol/surveillance aircraft, SIAI-Marchetti SF.260 trainers, Cougar AS-532 search and rescue (SAR), combat search and rescue (CSAR) and utility helicopters as well as the design and development of Unmanned aerial vehicles (UAVs), target drones and agricultural aircraft.

TAI's core business also includes modernization, modification and systems integration programs and after sales support of both fixed and rotary wing military and commercial aircraft that are in the inventory of Turkey and its allies.

Turkish Aerospace Industries' (TAI's) Hurkus basic trainer aircraft has been granted air worthiness type certification, the company announced at the 2016 Farnborough International Airshow.

Major programs 

 Electronic warfare retrofit and structural modifications on Turkish Air Force (TuAF) F-16s.
MLU, Falcon-Up and Falcon Star Modifications on the Royal Jordanian Air Force (RJAF) F-16s,
Modifications of 41 F-16A/B Block 15 aircraft of the Pakistan Air Force to F-16AM/BM Block 15 MLU standard.
Modification of the S-2E Tracker Maritime Patrol Aircraft into Fire Fighting Aircraft
CN-235 and Black Hawk modifications for the Turkish Special Forces
Modification of CN-235 platforms for MPA/MSA missions for the Turkish Navy and Coast Guard
Modification and modernization of Eurocopter AS 532,
Glass Cockpit Retrofit of S-70 helicopters,
Conversion of B737-700 aircraft AEW&C aircraft,
Avionics modernization of C-130 aircraft for the Turkish Air Force (TuAF),
 Production and Maintenance, Repair and Overhaul (MRO) of the center fuselage of Joint Strike Fighter F-35 aircraft,
Participating in the design and development of the A400M military transport and tanker aircraft,
Avionics modernization of T-38 aircraft for the TuAF,
License production of the attack helicopter Agusta A129 Mangusta as T-129 for the Turkish Armed Forces (TAF).
Design, development and production of TAI Hürkuş (Turkish Primary and Basic Training Aircraft) with EASA CS-23 certification.
Design, development and production of Anka unmanned aerial vehicle for the TuAF.
Turkish Aerospace / TUSAS produced 46 F-16s for the Egyptian Air Force between 1993 and 1995 under the agreement signed between the Governments of Turkey and the Arab Republic of Egypt. A contract to produce 46 Block 40 F-16C/D's for the Egyptian Air Force was placed with TUSAS Aerospace Industries (TAI) of Turkey. 34 of them will be F-16C's, 12 will be F-16D's. This was carried out under the auspices of the Peace Vector IV program, and marked the first sale of a foreign-built Fighting Falcon to a third-party nation in the history of the F-16 program.

TAI is engaged in manufacturing aerostructures for fixed and rotary wing, military and commercial aircraft for worldwide customers. TAI is in various partnership arrangements with AgustaWestland, Airbus, Alenia Aermacchi, Boeing, IAI, Lockheed Martin, Northrop Grumman, MD Helicopters, Sikorsky, Indonesian Aerospace and numerous other companies in aerospace sector.

TAI manufactures Section 18 fuselage panels for Airbus 319/320/321 aircraft, wing tips and flight deck panels for Boeing 737 aircraft, rear doors and engine cowlings for Eurocopter EC135 helicopters, MD 902 fuselage for MD Helicopters, horizontal stabilizers, tail rotor pylons and tail booms for Sikorsky S-70A and MH-60 helicopters, horizontal stabilizers for Sikorsky S-76 helicopters and AB139 fuselages for Agusta. Furthermore, TAI manufactures nose landing gear doors for the Boeing 747, dorsal fin for 777 and parts/subassembly parts for 737/767/777. It also manufactures seven components of the Eurocopter AS 532 helicopter.

TAI, which had a single program (the co-production of the F-16 Fighting Falcon) at its establishment phase, is working on over 50 military and commercial programs today.  As a partner of the Airbus Defence and Space, TAI has been participating in the design and development activities of the Airbus A400M program with the leading European aerospace companies; namely Airbus (France, Germany, Spain and UK), EADS CASA (Spain) and FLABEL (Belgium) from the beginning of the project. TAI has accepted the production of A350XWB's winglets with the new cooperation.

In May 2015, the Turkish regional jet project was launched, which consisted of the indigenous production of two regional aircraft in different sizes. It was a Fairchild Dornier 328JET-based, modernized aircraft with new cockpit and engines. The larger, 70-seat TRJ-628 jet would be ready in 2023. The project has since been cancelled.

Products

Designed 
 TAI Hürkuş
 TAI Hürjet
 TAI TF-X

Local production 

 TAI Hürkuş, two-seat, single engine, turboprop aircraft for training and ground attack
 TAI Hürjet, proposed advanced jet trainer and light attack aircraft
 TAI TFX, proposed stealth twin-engine all-weather air superiority fighter

Helicopters
 TAI/AgustaWestland T129 ATAK, light attack helicopter
 TAI T-70, Turkish variants of Sikorsky S-70i
 TAI T625, light utility helicopter
 TAI T629, medium attack helicopter
 TAI T925, heavy utility helicopter
 TAI T929 ATAK 2, heavy attack helicopter

Unmanned aerial vehicles
 TAI Aksungur MALE ISTAR 
 TAI Anka-A (TIHA-A) (2013), MALE ISTAR UAV
 TAI Anka-B (TIHA-B) (2013), MALE UAV
 TAI Anka-S  MALE UCAV
 TAI Baykuş (2004), tactical surveillance drone
 TAI Gözcü (2007), short-range tactical ISTAR drone
 TAI Keklik (2001), target drone for tracking and non-firing exercise
 TAI Martı (2003), surveillance drone
 TAI Pelikan (IHA-X2), tactical ISTAR drone
 TAI Şimşek, high-speed target drone
 TAI Turna (2001), target drone for tracking and live firing
TAI UAV-X1 (1982), surveillance drone

Satellites
 Göktürk-1, earth observation satellite
 Göktürk-2 (launched 2012), earth observation satellite
 Göktürk-3 satellite
 Türksat 6A, communications satellite
TAI operates Turkish Satellite Assembly, Integration and Test Center.

See also

 TEI

References

External links

 

Aerospace companies
Aircraft manufacturers of Turkey
Defence companies of Turkey
Government-owned companies of Turkey
Ministry of National Defense (Turkey)
Manufacturing companies based in Ankara
Space program of Turkey
Manufacturing companies established in 1984
Science and technology in Turkey
Turkish brands
Unmanned aerial vehicle manufacturers
Turkish companies established in 1984
Unmanned aerial vehicle manufacturers of Turkey